South Elmhurst is an unincorporated community in York Township, DuPage County, Illinois, United States.

Notes

Unincorporated communities in DuPage County, Illinois
Unincorporated communities in Illinois